Hendren Farm, also known as Andalusia, is a historic home and farm located near Hannibal, Marion County, Missouri.  The main house was built in the 1850s, and is a two-story, "T"-shaped, vernacular Greek Revival style brick dwelling. It features a one-story, three-bay front porch with a low hip roof supported by four square columns. Also on the property are the contributing clapboarded log house built about 1835 and a brick smokehouse.

It was added to the National Register of Historic Places in 1984.

References

Houses on the National Register of Historic Places in Missouri
Farms on the National Register of Historic Places in Missouri
Greek Revival houses in Missouri
Houses completed in 1835
Buildings and structures in Hannibal, Missouri
National Register of Historic Places in Marion County, Missouri